Gabriele Buschmeier (13 March 1955 – 14 July 2020) was a German musicologist.

Career
Buschmeier studied German, history, and musicology at universities in Cologne and Paris. She completed a doctoral degree at the University of Mainz with a thesis, Die Entwicklung von Arie und Szene in der französischen Oper von Gluck bis Spontini, which studied the evolution of solo songs in European opera. The revised version of her thesis, which was published in 1991, was "warmly recommended" by Jesse Rosenberg, although with criticism for the choices and reliability of her sources.

From 1994 onwards, she worked as a senior consultant for the coordination of musicological editions at the Academy of Sciences and Literature in Mainz.

Buschmeier died on 14 July 2020, aged 65.

References

1955 births
2020 deaths
German musicologists
People from Paderborn
Place of death missing
Johannes Gutenberg University Mainz alumni
20th-century German women scientists
21st-century German women scientists